1961–62 was the forty-ninth occasion on which the Lancashire Cup completion had been held. St. Helens won the trophy  by beating Swinton by the score of 25-9.

The match was played at Central Park, Wigan, (historically in the county of Lancashire). The attendance was 30,000, the last time the attendance at a Lancashire Cup final would reach 30,000, and receipts were £4,850.

This was the second of five consecutive Lancashire Cup final wins for St. Helens, and what is more, the second of the seven  victories in a period of nine successive seasons.

It was also the second of Swinton’s three successive Lancashire Cup final runner-up positions.

Background 

With again no invitation to a junior club this season, the total number of teams entering the competition remained the same at 14.

The same fixture format was retained, and due to the number of clubs this resulted in no bye but one “blank” or “dummy” fixture in the first round, and one bye in the second round

Competition and results

Round 1  
Involved 7 matches (with no bye but one “blank” fixture) and 14 clubs

Round 2 - quarterfinals 
Involved 3 matches (with one bye) and 7 clubs

Round 3 – semifinals  
Involved 2 matches and 4 clubs

Final

Teams and scorers 
 

Scoring - Try = three (3) points - Goal = two (2) points - Drop goal = two (2) points

The road to success

Notes and comments 
1 * Central Park was the home ground of Wigan with a final capacity of 18,000, although the record attendance was  47,747 for Wigan v St Helens 27 March 1959

See also 
1961–62 Northern Rugby Football League season
Rugby league county cups

References

External links
Saints Heritage Society
1896–97 Northern Rugby Football Union season at wigan.rlfans.com
Hull&Proud Fixtures & Results 1896/1897
Widnes Vikings - One team, one passion Season In Review - 1896-97
The Northern Union at warringtonwolves.org

1961 in English rugby league
RFL Lancashire Cup